Iphitus boucheti is a species of sea snail, a marine gastropod mollusc in the family Epitoniidae.

Description
The length of the shell attains 3.8 mm.

Original description
 Poppe G.T. & Tagaro S. (2016). New marine mollusks from the central Philippines in the families Aclididae, Chilodontidae, Cuspidariidae, Nuculanidae, Nystiellidae, Seraphsidae and Vanikoridae. Visaya. 4(5): 83-103. page(s): 90.

Distribution
This marine species occurs off the Philippines.

References

External links
 Worms Link

Epitoniidae
Gastropods described in 2016